The R160 or Hathazari-Khagrachhari Road is a transportation artery in Bangladesh, which connected National Highway N106 (at Hathazari Municipality) with Khagrachari City.

Junction list

The entire route is in Chittagong District.

Markets crossed 
Hathazari Municipality
Katirhat
Nazir Hat
Fatikchhari Municipality
Manikchhari
Guimara
Matiranga
Khagrachhari Municipality

See also
N1 (Bangladesh)

References

Regional Highways in Bangladesh